SkyTrain or Skytrain may refer to:

Guided ground transport

City mass transit
 SkyTrain (Vancouver), a metropolitan rapid transit network in Vancouver, Canada, that was originally mostly elevated
 SkyTrain (Metro Manila), a planned monorail line
 BTS Skytrain, an elevated rapid transit system in Bangkok, Thailand
 Skytrain, the elevated section of the Sydney Metro Northwest rapid transit line
 Accra Skytrain, a proposed automated transit system in Accra, Ghana

Airport people movers
 ATL Skytrain, a people-mover at Hartsfield–Jackson Atlanta International Airport
 Changi Airport Skytrain, an inter-terminal people-mover system at Singapore Changi Airport
 Soekarno–Hatta Airport Skytrain, an inter-terminal people-mover system at Soekarno–Hatta International Airport, Jakarta
 Düsseldorf SkyTrain, an automated inter-terminal people mover system at Düsseldorf International Airport
 Skytrain (Miami International Airport), a people mover at Miami International Airport
 PHX Sky Train, a people-mover system at Phoenix Sky Harbor International Airport

Air transport 
 Douglas C-47 Skytrain also known as the Dakota, a military transport developed from the Douglas DC-3 airliner
 McDonnell Douglas C-9 Skytrain II, a military transport developed from the Douglas DC-9 airliner
 Skytrain, a transatlantic service  by Laker Airways

Other uses
 Sky Train, a 1976 album by Barry Miles
 Skytrain Ice Rise, a large ice rise in the Filchner-Ronne ice shelf of Antarctica

See also 
 Aerotrain (disambiguation)
 SkyTran